MEV-1 can mean:

 MEV-1 (spacecraft), the first Mission Extension Vehicle spacecraft
 MEV-1 (fictional pathogen), the fictional virus in the film Contagion

See also
 MEV (disambiguation)